Joan of Plattsburg is a 1918 American propaganda comedy-drama film co-directed by William Humphrey and George Loane Tucker, written by Tucker from a story by Porter Emerson Browne, photographed by Oliver T. Marsh, released by the Goldwyn Pictures Corporation and starring Mabel Normand. It is not known whether the film currently survives, and it may be a lost film.

Plot
As described in a film magazine, Joan (Normand), an orphan, becomes interested in the drilling of soldiers at an American World War I training camp near the orphan asylum of which she is an inmate. One day while evading the angry superintendent, she conceals herself in a cellar and discovers a meeting place of German spies who are plotting. She believes that, like a modern-day Joan of Arc, she's listening to disembodied voices. She reports the matter to the major, who sets out to capture the spies and sends Joan to live with his mother. When he returns from the war, he finds Joan waiting for him.

Cast
Mabel Normand as Joan
Robert Elliott	as Capt. Lane
William Frederic as Supt. Fisher (billed as William Fredericks)
Joseph W. Smiley as Ingleton
Edward Elkas as Silverstein
John Webb Dillon as Miggs
Willard Dashiell as Colonel
Edith McAlpin as Mrs. Lane
Isabel Vernon as Mrs. Miggs

References

External links

 Joan of Plattsburg in the New York Times
 
 Joan of Plattsburg at Turner Classic Movies
 Joan of Plattsburg in the Toronto World
 Joan of Plattsburg in Visions of the Maid

1918 films
1918 comedy-drama films
1910s English-language films
American silent short films
American black-and-white films
Films directed by William J. Humphrey
1910s American films
Silent American comedy-drama films